Gelnica (district) is a district in the Košice Region of eastern Slovakia. It was established in 1923. Between 1960–1996 the district has been a part of the Spišská Nová Ves District. Then, in 1996 the Gelnica District was established in its present borders. It is the district with the highest percentage of forest area in Slovakia, 74,6%. The district's center is its biggest town, Gelnica.

Municipalities

See also
Bujanov Tunnel
Harmanec Tunnel

References

Districts of Slovakia
Geography of Košice Region